If Tomorrow Comes is a South Korean television series starring Seo Woo, Go Doo-shim, and Ha Seok-jin. A drama about the love and conflict between a mother and daughter, it aired on SBS from October 29, 2011 to April 22, 2012 on Saturdays and Sundays at 20:40 for 51 episodes.

Plot
Yoon Eun-chae is an only child. Her parents own a mid-sized construction company, which her mother Son Jung-in runs with an iron fist. There is nothing Jung-in wouldn't do for the family business. Unlike her mother, Eun-chae has a positive outlook on life. She is currently a graduate student studying interior design, and dating Lee Young-gyun.

Lee Young-gyun is an ordinary salaryman. His parents run a restaurant, and he has three older brothers and one sister—his eldest brother Jin-gyu is an aging bachelor, Sung-ryong has a limited mental capacity, and Il-bong is a troublemaker. Because of this, Jung-in doesn't approve of him as a match for her daughter.

Cast
Seo Woo as Yoon Eun-chae 
Go Doo-shim as Son Jung-in
Ha Seok-jin as Lee Young-gyun 
Kil Yong-woo as Yoon Won-seob
Kim Hye-sun as Kim Soon-jung
Lee Kyung-jin as Yoon Won-ja
Im Hyun-sik as Lee Kwi-nam
Lee Hye-sook as Kim Bo-bae
Park Soo-young as Lee Jin-gyu
In Gyo-jin as Lee Sung-ryong
Lee Kyu-han as Lee Il-bong
Yu Lia as Lee Ji-mi
Choi Jong-hwan as Seo In-ho
Nam Il-woo as Seo Dae-sa
Lee Seung-hyung as Son Jung-mo
Im Tae-yeol as Han-yi
Seo Yoo-jung as Hyun-sook
Kim So-yeon as Da-jung
Park Se-young as Seo Yoo-jin
Jung Min as Ji-ho
Shin Da-eun as Oh Soo-jung
Yoo Kyung-ah as department head
Lee Sun-ah as Yang Mi-hee
Kim So-won as Park Ji-young

Notes

References

External links
If Tomorrow Comes official SBS website 

Seoul Broadcasting System television dramas
2011 South Korean television series debuts
2012 South Korean television series endings
Korean-language television shows
South Korean romance television series